The HP 95LX Palmtop PC (F1000A, F1010A), also known as project Jaguar, was Hewlett Packard's first MS-DOS-based pocket computer, or personal digital assistant, introduced in April 1991 in collaboration with Lotus Development Corporation. It can be seen as successor to a series of larger portable PCs like the HP 110 and HP 110 Plus.

Hardware
HP 95LX had an Intel 8088-clone NEC V20 CPU running at 5.37 MHz with an Intel Corporation System on a chip (SoC) device. It cannot be considered completely PC-compatible because of its quarter-CGA (MDA)-resolution LCD screen.

The device also included a CR 2032 lithium coin cell for memory backup when the two AA main batteries ran out. For mass storage, HP 95LX had a single PCMCIA slot which could hold a static RAM card with its own CR 2025 back-up coin cell. An RS-232-compatible serial port was provided, as well as an infrared port for printing on compatible models of Hewlett Packard printers.

Display
In character mode, the display showed 16 lines of 40 characters, and had no backlight. While most IBM-compatible PCs work with a hardware code page 437, HP 95LX's text mode font was hard-wired to code page 850 instead. Lotus 1-2-3 internally used the Lotus International Character Set (LICS), but characters were translated to code page 850 for display and printing purposes.

Software
The palmtop ran Microsoft's MS-DOS version 3.22 and had a customized version of Lotus 1-2-3 Release 2.2 built in. Other software in read-only memory (ROM) included a calculator, an appointment calendar, a telecommunications program, and a simple text editor.

Successors
Successor models to HP 95LX include HP 100LX, HP Palmtop FX, HP 200LX, HP 1000CX, and HP OmniGo 700LX.

See also
DIP Pocket PC
Atari Portfolio
Poqet PC
Poqet PC Prime
Poqet PC Plus
Sharp PC-3000
ZEOS Pocket PC
Yukyung Viliv N5
Sub-notebook
Netbook
Palmtop PC
Ultra-mobile PC

References

External links
Hewlett Packard Web site on HP 95LX
HP 95LX technical information (contains PCB photos) 
Skolob's Hewlett Packard 95LX Palmtop Page (Information and FAQ on 95LX)

95LX
Computer-related introductions in 1991
IBM PC compatibles
NEC V20